Tudor Mihail (born 17 August 1984) is a Romanian former professional footballer who played as an attacking midfielder. He is the cousin of former Romania international player Alin Stoica.

Career
Mihail was born in Bucharest, Romania. After spending his youth career playing for both Dinamo and Steaua Mihail made his senior and professional debut in the 2001–02 season for Rocar Bucuresti.

In 2003, at the age of 18, Mihail trialled with Belgian club Club Brugge.

In summer of 2005, Mihail moved to Sibiu where he spent one season.

References

1984 births
Living people
Association football midfielders
Romanian footballers
AFC Rocar București players
CS Concordia Chiajna players
Romanian expatriate footballers
Romanian expatriate sportspeople in Belgium
Expatriate footballers  in Belgium